The 2015–16 Moldovan Under-18 Division was the Moldovan annual football tournament. The season began on 11 September 2015 and ended on 22 May 2016. Zimbru Chișinău were the defending champions.

Stadia and locations

Squads
Players must be born on or after 1 January 1998, with a maximum of five players per team born between 1 January 1997 and 31 December 1997 allowed.

League table
The schedule consists of three rounds. During the first two rounds, each team plays each other once home and away for a total of 14 matches. The pairings of the third round will then be set according to the standings after the first two rounds, giving every team a third game against each opponent for a total of 21 games per team.

Results 
Matches 1−14

Matches 15−21

References

2015–16 in Moldovan football